Patricia Louise Parkinson (née Woodroffe, 14 July 1926 – 5 August 2001) was a New Zealand fencer who won a silver medal for her country at the 1950 British Empire Games.

Early life and family
Born Patricia Louise Woodroffe on 14 July 1926 in the Auckland suburb of Epsom, Parkinson was the daughter of Louise Olivia Woodroffe (née Martin) and William David Woodroffe. Educated at St Cuthbert's College, she married Finlay James Parkinson in the mid 1950s, but they later divorced.

Fencing
Woodroffe won the New Zealand national fencing championship in three consecutive years, from 1947 to 1949.  She represented New Zealand at the 1950 British Empire Games in Auckland, winning the silver medal with a record of six wins from seven bouts, losing only to the gold medallist, Mary Glen-Haig.

Death
Parkinson died on 5 August 2001, and her body was cremated at Hamilton Park Cemetery.

References

1926 births
2001 deaths
Sportspeople from Auckland
People educated at St Cuthbert's College, Auckland
New Zealand female foil fencers
Fencers at the 1950 British Empire Games
Commonwealth Games silver medallists for New Zealand
Commonwealth Games medallists in fencing
Medallists at the 1950 British Empire Games